Christian Galliard de Lavernée, born 2 May 1950 in Lyon, Rhône, is a French civil servant.

Career 
 1973  : Sciences Po Lyon
 1975  : École nationale d'administration (ENA), promotion André Malraux.
 1979  : Sub-prefect of Pithiviers, in Pithiviers City.
 1995  : Prefect of Ariège, in Foix. 
 2006  : Prefect of Yvelines, in Versailles.
 2008  : Prefect of Burgundy, prefect of Côte-d'Or, in Dijon.
 2010  : Prefet of Lorraine, prefect of the  Est, prefect of Moselle, in Metz.
 2012  : Prefect of Pays de la Loire, prefect of Loire-Atlantique, in Nantes.

References
  « Lavernée, Christian, Marie, Astorgue Galliard de » (prefect, born 1950), page 1303 in Who's Who in France : Dictionnaire biographique de personnalités françaises vivant en France et à l’étranger, et de personnalités étrangères résidant en France, 44th  edition for 2013 printed in 2012, 2371 p., 31 cm,  .
  http://www.whoswho.fr/bio/christian-de-lavernee_36116 : Who's Who in France on line (access restricted : fees).

Living people
1950 births
Civil servants from Lyon
École nationale d'administration alumni
Prefects of France
Prefects of Ariège (department)
Prefects of Yvelines
Prefects of Côte-d'Or
Prefects of Moselle (department)
Prefects of Loire-Atlantique
Officiers of the Légion d'honneur
Commanders of the Ordre national du Mérite